Neodorcadion bilineatum is a species of beetle in the family Cerambycidae. It was described by Ernst Friedrich Germar in 1824. It is known from Romania, Bosnia and Herzegovina, Hungary, Croatia, North Macedonia, Slovakia, Bulgaria, Greece, Moldova, Montenegro, Albania, Turkey, Serbia, and Ukraine.

References

Dorcadiini
Beetles described in 1824